Lac-Casault is an unorganized territory in the Bas-Saint-Laurent region of Quebec, Canada.

The small eponymous Lake Casault is located near the village of St-Alexandre-des-Lacs and was named in honour of Louis-Napoléon Casault (1823–1908).

Demographics
Population trend:
 Population in 2021: 30
 Population in 2016: 0
 Population in 2011: 5
 Population in 2006: 20
 Population in 2001: 0
 Population in 1996: 0
 Population in 1991: 3

Private dwellings occupied by usual residents: 24 (total dwellings: 142)

See also
 List of unorganized territories in Quebec

References

Unorganized territories in Bas-Saint-Laurent
La Matapédia Regional County Municipality